Sunflecks are brief increases in solar irradiance that occur in understories of an ecosystem when sunlight is able to directly reach the ground. They are caused by either wind moving branches and/or leaves in the canopy or as the sun moves during the day. Although each sunfleck only last for seconds or minutes at a time, they can be responsible more than 80% of the photons that reach plants in the understory, and up to 35% of carbon fixation. This makes them important sources of energy for plants in the understory of forests. The amount of energy that a sunfleck provides depends on their duration, size and shape and the intensity of photosynthetically active radiation (PAR), which itself depends on the arrangement of vegetation in the canopy and the position of the sun in the sky.

The abundance of sunflecks varies greatly both within and between ecosystems, generally the frequency and intensity of sunflecks decreases as tree {i.e., plant or canopy} height and the leaf area index increase.

There is no clear distinction between sunflecks and sunpatches, although the latter tend to last for at least an hour and the intensity of PAR reaches the full level of sunlight, whereas the intensity of PAR in sunflecks rarely reaches this. Because the amount of diffuse sunlight reaching the forest floor varies depending on the type of forest, there is no way to quantify an intensity of direct sunlight that qualifies as a sunfleck.

References

Forest ecology